Lucernaria is a genus of cnidarians belonging to the family Lucernariidae.

The species of this genus are found in Europe and America.

Species:

Lucernaria australis 
Lucernaria bathyphila 
Lucernaria haeckeli 
Lucernaria infundibulum 
Lucernaria janetae 
Lucernaria quadricornis 
Lucernaria sainthilairei 
Lucernaria sainthilarei 
Lucernaria walteri

References

Lucernariidae
Medusozoa genera